NYCRR may refer to:
New York Central Railroad
New York Codes, Rules and Regulations